is a Japanese auto racing driver. He is the younger brother of 2008 Macau Grand Prix winner Keisuke Kunimoto. As of 2021, he is racing for Team KCMG in the Super Formula Championship, and for Racing Project Bandoh in Super GT.

Career highlights
 2008 Formula Challenge Japan, Series Champion; Formula BMW, Macau GP Support race, 5th position
 2007 Formula Toyota, 10th Overall; Formula Challenge Japan, 4th Overall
 2006 All Japan Kart Championship, FA Class, 8th Overall
 2005 All Japan Kart Championship, ICA Class, 3rd Overall
 2004 All Japan Kart Championship, ICA Class, 7th Overall; F-ARTA Arta Challenge Series
 2003 All Japan Kart Championship, ICA Class; F-ARTA Arta Challenge Series
 2002 All Japan Junior Kart Championship, 4th Overall
 2001 All Japan Junior Kart Championship, 12th Overall

Racing record

Career summary

Complete Super GT results

Complete Formula Nippon/Super Formula results
(key) (Races in bold indicate pole position) (Races in italics indicate fastest lap)

* Season still in progress.

24 Hours of Le Mans results

References

External links

 
Official website
Twitter Page
Instagram Page

Living people
1990 births
Japanese racing drivers
Japanese Formula 3 Championship drivers
Japanese people of Korean descent
Super GT drivers
Formula Nippon drivers
Super Formula drivers
Sportspeople from Yokohama
24 Hours of Le Mans drivers

Formula Challenge Japan drivers
Formula BMW Pacific drivers
TOM'S drivers
Toyota Gazoo Racing drivers
Team LeMans drivers
KCMG drivers
Kondō Racing drivers
FIA World Endurance Championship drivers
21st-century Japanese people